Dowlatabad (also Romanized as Dowlatābād and Daulatābād) is a village in Qasabeh-ye Sharqi Rural District, in the Central District of Sabzevar County, Razavi Khorasan Province, Iran. At the 2006 census, its population was 1,220, in 324 families. Dowlatabad is the home of one of the most important writers of contemporary Iran, Mahmoud Dowlatabadi.

References 

Populated places in Sabzevar County